Yoo Yoonjin (born July 28, 1992), better known as Jinnytty (Chinese: 企鵝妹), is a South Korean Twitch streamer and YouTuber.

Career
Yoo is best known for her IRL livestreams on Twitch. She graduated from University High School in 2010, then graduated from Yonsei University with a degree in Information and Interaction Design in South Korea. She first started live streaming on Twitch at the end of June 2017. During this period, she liked to play Hearthstone, and she also watched professional player games or teaching videos. After becoming popular, Yoo catered to the audience with high interactivity, pure style, and increased her Taiwanese content. She also traveled to Taiwan in March 2018 and held a fan meeting. At the end of the 2019, Yoo changed her target audience to European and American audiences and also traveled to the United States. During the COVID-19 pandemic, she stayed at the home of the American streamer EsfandTV for several months, and they streamed together from time to time. From 2020 to 2022, Yoo traveled to and streamed live in Korea, Europe and the United States.

On October 6, 2022, it was announced that Yoo had signed with esports organization TSM.

Controversies

The Last of Us 2 comments 
On July 24, 2020, Yoo's Twitch account was suspended as a result of her comments about a character from The Last of Us 2 while playing as Abby, "I wanna see Ellie and Joel. Like, seriously, I don't wanna look at this transgender anymore. Please." Yoo apologized and Twitch reversed the suspension eight hours later.

Reckless driving 
On October 20, 2020, Yoo was suspended from Twitch again for three days after running through a red light while driving a scooter during her visit to Germany.

Stephen Hawking Spider-Man 
On December 4, 2021, Yoo was live streaming at the Los Angeles Comic-Con when she walked past a parent, dressed as Doctor Strange, and their child dressed as Spider-Man, who was in a wheelchair. "Oh wow, this is really cool. Like a... Stephen Hawking Spider-Man," she then proclaimed, within earshot of the pair, before repeating herself again as she walked away, "Yeah, they're like a Stephen Hawking Spider-Man." As soon as Yoo made her comment, her Twitch chat was flooded with responses asking her to apologize. Soon after, she issued the requested apology on Twitter.

Filmography

Music videos

Awards and nominations

References 

Living people
South Korean YouTubers
Twitch (service) streamers
21st-century South Korean women
1992 births
Yonsei University alumni
South Korean expatriates in the United States
Women video bloggers
YouTube vloggers
South Korean bloggers
South Korean women bloggers